TK Records was an American independent record label founded by record distributor Henry Stone and Steve Alaimo in 1972. and based in Hialeah, Florida. The record label went bankrupt in 1981.

"TK" was inspired by the initials of sound engineer Terry Kane, who built a recording studio in the attic of Stone's office in Hialeah.

TK Records is closely associated with the early rise of disco music, having in 1974 been the label that released the second bona fide disco song (after The Hues Corporation's "Rock The Boat") to reach No. 1 on the pop music charts, namely "Rock Your Baby" by George McCrae.  A little more than a year after McCrae's hit, the record label struck gold with KC & The Sunshine Band, releasing five singles that reached No. 1 on the Billboard Hot 100: including "Get Down Tonight", "That's the Way (I Like It)", "(Shake, Shake, Shake) Shake Your Booty", "I'm Your Boogie Man", and "Please Don't Go". The KC & The Sunshine Band single "Keep It Comin' Love" reached No. 1 on Billboard's erstwhile Hot Soul Singles chart and No. 2 on the Billboard Hot 100.

TK's subsidiary labels included Wolf and Bold Records. At one point, they had established a gospel label named Gospel Roots.  Artists signed to TK Records and its subsidiaries included Betty Wright (Alston), Clarence Reid, a.k.a. Blowfly, Benny Latimore (Glades), Peter Brown (Drive), Foxy, Kracker (Dash), Jimmy "Bo" Horne (Sunshine Sound), Timmy Thomas (Glades), Little Beaver, Gwen McCrae (Cat), T-Connection (Dash), Bobby Caldwell (Clouds), and Anita Ward (Juana).   Within a couple of years, TK's recognition for disco music would be surpassed by other labels such as Casablanca Records and RSO Records.

In 1980, TK Records encountered financial problems and the label was acquired by Morris Levy's Roulette Records; a merger of the two labels created Sunnyview Records. The last single to be released on the TK label was "Weird Al" Yankovic's "Another One Rides the Bus" (1981). In 1986, Henry Stone formed Hot Productions with Paul Klein and continued to re-release the TK Records catalog on CD until Sunnyview's acquisition by EMI-Rhino in 1989. Rhino owns the North American rights to the Sunnyview/TK catalog; internationally, the catalog was managed by EMI until 2013, when Rhino's sister label Parlophone took over after Warner Music Group's acquisition of the remaining EMI assets.

On October 12, 2013, Henry Stone received a proclamation from City of Hialeah Mayor Carlos Hernandez declaring it TK Records Day every year on October 12.

Wolf Records (subsidiary)
Wolf Records was a jazz subsidiary that released only three albums, each produced by Joel Dorn: 
1976: Encourage the People – Robin Kenyatta
1977: After the Dance – Harold Vick
1978: Innocence – Kenny Barron

There is a present-day Austrian record label of the same name that was founded in 1982 and specializes in releasing blues music.

See also 
 List of record labels

References

External links
The TK Records Story from BSN Pubs

1972 establishments in Florida
1981 disestablishments in Florida
Record labels based in Florida
Rhythm and blues record labels
Record labels disestablished in 1981
Record labels established in 1972
Companies based in Miami
EMI
Rhino Entertainment
Labels distributed by Warner Music Group